Seolleung Station is a Seoul Subway station that serves Line 2 and the Suin-Bundang Line. The station is named after the nearby Seonjeongneung, Joseon Dynasty royal tombs Seolleung (선릉, 宣陵) and Jeongneung (정릉, 靖陵).

On Line 2, the preceding and following stations are Yeoksam Station and Samseong Station. On the Suin-Bundang Line these are Seonjeongneung Station, which connects with Line 9, and Hanti Station.

Facilities
In 2011, retailer Home plus opened the world's first virtual supermarket in the station, where smartphone users can photograph the bar codes of life-size pictures, on the walls and platform screen doors, of 500 items of food, toiletries, electronics etc., for delivery within the same day.

Passenger load
In a survey conducted in 2011 by the Ministry of Land, Transport and Maritime Affairs on 92 Administrative divisions across the country, it reported that Seolleung Station is the fourth-busiest public transit stop following Gangnam Station, Jamsil Station, Sadang Station; and followed by Sillim Station.

References

Seoul Metropolitan Subway stations
Metro stations in Gangnam District
Railway stations opened in 1982
1982 establishments in South Korea
20th-century architecture in South Korea